Lateef Akinola Salako NNOM, CON (5 July 1935 – 8 December 2017) was a Nigerian academic who was professor emeritus of pharmacology and therapeutics at the University of Ibadan.

Early life
Lateef Akinola Salako was born on 5 July 1935 in Lagos State, south-western Nigeria.
He attended Methodist Boys High School, Victoria Island, Lagos where he obtained the West African Senior School Certificate in 1953.
He trained at the University College Hospital, Ibadan before he proceeded to University of Sheffield where he received a doctorate degree in 1969.

Career
He began his career in 1962, at the University College Hospital, Ibadan where he rose to the position of Senior Registrar in 1965, and in 1966,  he became a Medical Research Training Fellow, University of Ibadan. He was a Fellow in Clinical Pharmacology at the Department of Pharmacology and Therapeutics, University of Sheffield for two years, between 1967 and 1969.
In 1969, he was appointed as Lecturer in Clinical Pharmacology, University of Ibadan, Ibadan where he rose to the position of senior lecturer in 1970, and in 1973, he was appointed a Professor of Clinical Pharmacology.
In 1997, he was elected President of the Nigerian Academy of Science to succeed Professor Awele Maduemezia.

Awards and honor
Ogun State Distinguished Citizen Award, (1990)
Nigerian National Order of Merit Award (1992)
Commander of the Order of Niger (2004)

References

Living people
1935 births
University of Ibadan alumni
Academic staff of the University of Ibadan
People from Lagos State
Methodist Boys' High School alumni
Nigerian pharmacologists
Alumni of the University of Sheffield
Recipients of the Nigerian National Order of Merit Award
Fellows of the Nigerian Academy of Science